Emmanuelle Bertrand (born 5 November 1973 in Firminy, Loire), is a French cellist.

Biography
Bertrand studied with Jean Deplace and Philippe Muller, and received early support from Henri Dutilleux.

Nicolas Bacri has dedicated to her his Fourth Suite for cello solo op. 50. She premiered Luciano Berio's Chanson pour Pierre Boulez in 2000.

Her recordings as a soloist or together with the pianist  have received the highest musical awards : Cannes Classical Award, Diapason d'Or, "Choc" of Le Monde de la musique, etc. She also received a Victoire de la musique classique in 2002 and has been decorated as a "Chevalier de l'Ordre des Arts et des Lettres".

Together with the pianist Pascal Amoyel and the director Jean Piat, she created in 2005 the theatral concert "Block 15".

Critical reaction

Recordings 
Works for solo cello.  Works by Henri Dutilleux (Trois strophes sur le nom de SACHER), Hans Werner Henze (Serenade), George Crumb (Sonata), Gyorgy Ligeti (Sonata), Nicolas Bacri (Suite No. 4). Radio France. Harmonia Mundi, HMN 911699, 2000.

Le violoncelle parle (The cello speaks).  Works by Benjamin Britten (Suite for solo cello No. 3 Op. 87), Gaspar Cassado (Suite for solo cello), Pascal Amoyel (Itinerance), Zoltán Kodály (Sonata for solo cello Op. 8).  CD and DVD (le violoncelle parle, a Christian Leble film). Harmonia Mundi, HMN 902078, 2011.

External links 
Official site of Emmanuelle Bertrand

1971 births
French women classical cellists
Living people
People from Firminy
Chevaliers of the Ordre des Arts et des Lettres
21st-century French women musicians
21st-century cellists